It's a Great Feeling is a 1949 American Technicolor musical comedy film starring Doris Day, Jack Carson and Dennis Morgan in a parody of what goes on behind the scenes in Hollywood movie making.  The screenplay by Jack Rose and Mel Shavelson was based upon a story by I. A. L. Diamond. The film was directed by David Butler, produced by Alex Gottlieb and distributed by Warner Bros.

It's a Great Feeling was Day's third film (and her third pairing with Carson) and the first to bring her widespread notice. It's a Great Feeling is a "Who's Who?" of Hollywood in its heyday and glorified the studio system at the peak of its golden age.

Plot
The film begins with a succession of real-life film directors, including Michael Curtiz, King Vidor, Raoul Walsh, and David Butler – refusing to helm a new Warner's film, Mademoiselle Fifi, because Jack Carson has been signed to star in it. Frustrated, fictional studio head Arthur Trent finally decides to let Carson direct it. Seeking the perfect co-star for himself and fellow lead Dennis Morgan, Carson finds her in the person of studio commissary waitress Judy Adams, who has been in Hollywood for three months without even one audition and sneaks her way into Carson's office, where she forces him to give her a chance. A self-proclaimed liar, Carson advises her to pose as his secret bride to Morgan. Fooled at first, Morgan eventually catches on to the ruse. Following an angry outburst, Judy leaves the studio and feels used by the two actors for their entertainment.

Moving on, Carson continues his search for his romantic interest in the film, but nobody seems to be willing to work with him. When Jane Wyman is offered the role, she even faints. Dennis suggests to Carson that he should cast an unknown, because only outsiders are unaware of his image and would be willing to work with him. Judy is the first person that comes to their mind, though they do not know that – because of them – Judy has become disillusioned by Hollywood and is set to return to her home town, Goerke's Corners, Wisconsin.  Both Carson and Morgan want to be the one who has discovered Judy officially, and go their separate ways to convince Judy to return to Warner Brothers and assume the role. Arriving at the station at the same time to stop Judy from leaving, and after running into Danny Kaye, both men succeed in making Judy believe that they will help her get her big break in the movies.

Carson and Morgan start by dressing Judy as a film star in order to impress Trent. At a fancy dress shop, Joan Crawford suspects that Judy is being taken advantage of, and condemns both men for it. Carson remembers that Trent likes to discover his own talent, so he dresses Judy in a number of different guises – such as an elevator operator, a cab driver and an oculist's assistant – in the hope Trent will see her, appreciate her potential, and insist Carson cast the unknown. Unfortunately, all Trent keeps seeing is a pretty blonde with a goofy smile and blinking eyes. Morgan, having lost all hope, discourages Judy from becoming an actress, but she is now determined to have her big break, explaining the hard work she has done to afford acting and singing lessons, as well as moving to Hollywood. By this time, both men are now not only fighting over discovering Judy, but also for her romantic attention.

Carson and Morgan attempt to arrange a screen test for Judy and continue their schemes to impress her. They are stopped at the studio, but Edward G. Robinson helps them sneak in. In the studio, they arrange for Judy to perform the song "That Was a Big Fat Lie" on camera directed by a reluctant Ray Heindorf. The screen test undergoes technical difficulties, which startles Trent when seeing it, and, coming on top of his "visions" of the same face everywhere (when Carson and Morgan planted Judy all around him), results in a nervous breakdown and a cancellation of production of Mademoiselle Fifi. As a final attempt, Carson and Morgan conspire to disguise Judy as a famous French film star with dark hair named Yvonne Amour – and an inaccurate accent – but Trent still manages to recognize her despite the great amount of attention that "Yvonne" is receiving, including a meeting with Eleanor Parker and Patricia Neal and a performance of the song "At the Cafe Rendezvous".

Upset with all the backstage shenanigans she's been forced to endure, Judy considers returning home to Goerke's Corners to marry long-time sweetheart Jeffrey Bushdinkle. Carson and Morgan consider stopping her, but Judy's friend Grace makes them realize that she will be much happier with her fiancé in a small town than an uncertain career in Hollywood, and they step back. Judy overhears them promising another girl a career in the pictures, confirming her doubt of having been used by the actors. She leaves in tears and coincidentally shares the train with Trent. Now realizing her talent, Trent offers Judy a career in pictures, but she thinks he is lying as well and rejects him. Nonetheless, Trent announces that the film is back in production with Judy Adams as the only contender for the lead role. Carson and Morgan rush to Goerke's Corners to share the news with Judy, but realize that they have to interfere with her wedding, and decide to leave to let Judy lead a small-town life. Their curiosity as to what her fiancé has to attract her so strongly is satisfied when his face is revealed to be that of Errol Flynn.

Cast
 Dennis Morgan as himself 
 Jack Carson as himself
 Doris Day as Judy Adams
 Errol Flynn as Jeffrey Bushdinkle (Cameo appearance)
 Bill Goodwin as Arthur Trent
 Claire Carleton as Grace
 Lois Austin as Saleslady
 Irving Bacon as Railroad Information Clerk
 Frank Cady as Oculist
 Pat Flaherty as Charlie, Studio Gate Guard
 Sandra Gould as Train Passenger in Upper Berth
 James Holden as Soda Jerk
 William J. O'Brien as Reporter
 Georges Renavent as Andre Bernet
 Olan Soule as Flack 
 Nita Talbot as Model

Cameos
Many of the studio's most popular stars and directors make cameo appearances throughout the movie. Among them are:
 Bugs Bunny voiced by Mel Blanc
 Gary Cooper
 Joan Crawford
 Eleanor Parker
 Ronald Reagan
 Edward G. Robinson
 Jane Wyman
 Michael Curtiz
 Sydney Greenstreet
 Ray Heindorf
 Danny Kaye
 Patricia Neal
 King Vidor
 Raoul Walsh
 David Butler

Reagan and Wyman's daughter Maureen also makes an appearance in a scene with her mother.

Production
The film's working title was Two Guys and a Gal. The film resembled Day's early career as a waitress struggling to get into the pictures and nearly landing her big break when prepared to leave Hollywood. It's a Great Feeling was Day's third film and third-to-last collaboration with Carson. On working with him, Day wrote in her autobiography:

In June 1948, Day's participation in the film was confirmed. By that time, Carson and Morgan were already cast. The film also went under the title Two Guys of the Nineties and, due to insistence of Carson and Morgan as Two Guys from Hollywood (though Morgan had previously stated in an interview that he would never star in another film with "Two Guys" in the title).

Musical numbers
"At the Cafe Rendezvous"
"That Was a Big Fat Lie"
"Blame My Absent-Minded Heart"
"Fiddle Dee Dee"
"Give Me a Song with a Beautiful Melody"
"There's Nothing Rougher Than Love"
"It's a Great Feeling"

Reception
Variety commented: "Joan Crawford (as herself) does a pip of a bit in a swank gown shop with the three principals, rating plenty of howls." In his book on Doris Day's career, author Tom Santopietro writes that the Crawford's self-parody of her "notoriously dramatic" screen image is the funniest bit in the film. Crawford supposedly overhears Jack Carson and Dennis Morgan discussing Doris Day and thinks they are taking advantage of her. She automatically launches into a clichéd, melodramatic speech typical of her screen persona (in this case, from Mildred Pierce) and furiously slaps both Jack Carson and Dennis Morgan. Carson asks "What's that for?" and Crawford smiles, shrugs and says: "I do that in all my pictures!"

Box Office
According to Warner Bros. records, the film earned $2,059,000 domestically and $654,000 in overseas markets.

Awards and nominations
The title tune "It's a Great Feeling" (written by Jule Styne and Sammy Cahn), received an Academy Award nomination for Best Song.

References

External links 
 
 
 
 
 

1949 films
1949 musical comedy films
American musical comedy films
American parody films
Looney Tunes films
Bugs Bunny films
Films about Hollywood, Los Angeles
Films directed by David Butler
Films set in Los Angeles
Warner Bros. films
1940s English-language films
1940s American films